Autun is a subprefecture of the Saône-et-Loire department in the Bourgogne-Franche-Comté region of central-eastern France. It was founded during the Principate era of the early Roman Empire by Emperor Augustus as Augustodunum to give a Roman capital to the Gallic people Aedui, who had Bibracte as their political centre. In Roman times the city may have been home to 30,000 to 100,000 people, according to different estimates. Nowadays, the commune has a population of about 15,000.

Geography
The commune lies in the northwest of the department.

History

Early history

Augustodunum was founded during the reign of the first Roman emperor, Augustus, after whom it was named. It was the civitas "tribal capital" of the Aedui, Continental Celts who had been allies and "brothers" of Rome since before Julius Caesar's Gallic Wars. Several elements of Roman architecture such as walls, gates, and a Roman theater are still visible in the town.

In AD 356, a force of Alemanni brought the siege of Autun. The disrepair of the walls left the city in danger of falling. Autun was saved by the arrival of the Emperor Julian in one of his early military successes. In Late Antiquity, Autun became famous for its schools of rhetoric. A world map based on the Geography of Ptolemy was famous for its size and was displayed in the portico of one of the schools. It may have survived until early modern times.

In 532 the Merovingian kings Childebert I and Chlothar I in Battle of Autun defeated the Burgundians led by king Godomar and took over the country of Burgundy. In 642 or 643, another battle was fought near Autun between feuding Frankish noblemen.

In 725, the Umayyad general Anbasa ibn Suhaym Al-Kalbi (عنبسة بن سحيم الكلبي) marched up the Saône valley to Autun. On 22 August 725 he captured the town after defeating forces led by the local bishop, Émilien of Nantes, who was slain during the course of the battle.

Autun marks the easternmost extent of the Umayyad campaign in Europe. However, the position was never retained, and Anbasa died soon after. The Umayyads are known to have raided the lower Rhone during the next decade, but Uzès was their northernmost stronghold and possibly Marseille the easternmost coastal stronghold. In 880, Count Richard of Autun was made the first Duke of Burgundy.

Modern times 
In 1788, Charles Maurice de Talleyrand-Périgord became bishop of Autun. He was elected member of the clergy for the Estates-General of 1789.

The High School plays an important role in the history of the city and even France since Napoleon, who gave it its current name and whose brothers Joseph and Lucien studied there. This school continues to operate today. The decorated wrought iron gates were erected in 1772; the subjects taught in the school are indicated by various representations of objects along the top of these grids.

During the Franco-Prussian War of 1870, the leader of the Army of the Vosges, Giuseppe Garibaldi, chose the city as his headquarters.

Population

Sights

The city boasts two ancient Roman gates (Porte Saint-André and Porte d'Arroux) and other ruins dating to the time of Augustus. One of the most impressive remains is that of the ancient theatre, which was one of the largest in the western part of the empire with a 17,000-seat capacity. To the northwest of the city is the so-called Temple of Janus, only two walls (faces) of which remain. To the southeast is the mysterious Pierre de Couhard, a rock pyramid of uncertain function which may date to Roman times.

Autun Cathedral, also known as Saint Lazare Cathedral, dates from the early twelfth century and is a major example of Romanesque architecture. It was formerly the chapel of the Dukes of Burgundy; their palace was the actual episcopal residence. The cathedral was originally built as a pilgrimage church for the veneration of the relic Saint Lazarus, mentioned in the Gospels, and considered the first bishop of Marseille, and who, always according to tradition, arrived in Provence with Mary Magdalen.

Autun's 12th-century bishop, Étienne de Bâgé, probably built the church in response to the construction of Ste. Madeleine at nearby Vézelay, home to the French cult of Mary Magdalene. St. Lazare was only later elevated to the rank of cathedral, replacing the former cathedral dedicated to St. Nazaire.

The Autun Cathedral is famous for its architectural sculpture, particularly the tympanum of The Last Judgment above the west portal, surviving fragments from the lost portal of the north transept, and the capitals in the nave and choir. All of these are traditionally considered the work of Gislebertus, whose name is on the west tympanum. It is uncertain whether Gislebertus is the name of the sculptor or of a patron. If Gislebertus is in fact the artist, he is one of very few medieval artists whose name is known.

Other notable connections
 Bishop and Saint Leodegar (c. 615 – 679)
 Nivelon I (d. 768) was known as Count of Autun
 In the late 9th century, Charles Martel's daughter (name listed as Auda, Alane, or Aldana) married Thierry IV (also called Theoderich or Theoderic), Count of Autun.
 In the late 9th century, the countship was vacant after the death of Robert the Strong, but was returned to Bernard Plantapilosa, son of Bernard of Septimania, and then later to Bernard of Gothia after Bernard fell out of favor.
 In 878, King Louis the Younger took the countship away and gave it to his chamberlain, Theodoric.
 Honorius Augustodunensis (died c. 1151)
 Barthélemy de Chasseneuz practiced law in Autun in 1506, became crown attorney of the Autun bailliage in 1508, where he made his reputation as a criminal lawyer by his eloquent defense of a group of rats who were put on trial for destroying the barley crop of the province.
 Nicolas Rolin, Chancellor of Burgundy under Philip the Good, came from Autun, where several examples of his artistic patronage can be seen. The Rolin Madonna, by Jan van Eyck, in the Louvre, shows what was probably at least intended as a view of Autun in the background.
 In 1837, a commercial mining of oil shale deposit near Autun marked the beginning of the modern oil-shale industry.
 In 1852, the uranium mineral autunite was first discovered near Autun, and named for the town.
Autun is the main setting for James Salter's 1967 novel A Sport and a Pastime.
 The European Triathlon Championships were also held in the town in 2006.
 The Fifth Stage of the 2007 Tour de France ended in the town, with the entrance to Autun being a twisting and winding route down from a nearby mountain.

Tourism

Autun's best-known museum is the Musée Rolin. It houses historical artistic collections.

Near Autun, tourists can also see:
 The Arboretum de Pézanin, one of the richest forest collection in France
 The Rock of Solutré
 Cluny Abbey and its medieval city
 Charolles and the "boeuf charolais"
 Mâcon, Paray-le-Monial

Sister cities
Autun has sister city relationships with the following municipalities.

See also
 Abbey of St Andoche, Autun
 Abbey of Saint-Jean-le-Grand
 Autun Cathedral
 Communes of the Saône-et-Loire department
 Morvan Regional Natural Park
 Musée Rolin
 Roman Catholic Diocese of Autun

References

Further reading
 Westermann, Großer Atlas zur Weltgeschichte (in German)

External links

 Official website 
 Visiting Autun (tourist map and photos)
 Adrian Fletcher's Paradoxplace – Autun Cathedral St-Lazare Photo Pages
 The Stevenage-Ingelheim-Autun Association

Archaeological sites in France
Communes of Saône-et-Loire
Romanesque architecture in Burgundy
Subprefectures in France
Aedui
Gallia Lugdunensis
Burgundy